The Mule Spring Limestone is a geologic formation in the Saline Range of eastern California and Split Mountain and Goldfield Hills of Nevada.

It is also to be found in the Inyo Mountains and White Mountains.

It preserves fossils, such as trilobites, dating back to the Cambrian period.

See also

 List of fossiliferous stratigraphic units in Nevada
 Paleontology in Nevada

References

 

Cambrian California
Cambrian geology of Nevada
Limestone formations of the United States
Geology of Inyo County, California
Geology of Nye County, Nevada
Natural history of the Mojave Desert
Natural history of Inyo County, California
Natural history of Nye County, Nevada